Jack's Bar-B-Que is a barbecue restaurant located on 416 Broadway in Nashville, Tennessee behind the Ryman Auditorium, founded by Jack Cawthon. He has been described as the "Barbeque King of Nashville". Offerings include smoked Tennessee pork shoulder sandwiches, sweet tea, and sides such as macaroni and cheese. The restaurant is decorated with pictures of owner Jack Cawthon with customers.

Jack's Bar-B-Que Texas Sweet Hot Sauce was named "The Best Sauce on the Planet" by the American Royal on September 20, 2014.

References

Restaurants in Nashville, Tennessee